Aaron Rakeffet-Rothkoff (born December 2, 1937) is an Israeli-American professor of rabbinic literature at Yeshiva University's Caroline & Joseph Gruss Institute in Jerusalem.

Biography

Rabbi Rakeffet attended Bnei Akiva as a youth.  Meir Kahane was one of his madrichim (counselors).  Rabbi Rakeffet met his future wife Malkah while giving a shiur at Bnei Akiva.

Rabbi Rakeffet started his career in 1961 as a pulpit rabbi at Lower Merion Synagogue in Bala Cynwyd, Pennsylvania. In 1962, he moved from Lower Merion to become the spiritual leader of the first Orthodox synagogue in suburban Essex County, Congregation Beth Ephraim of Maplewood and South Orange, New Jersey.  During that time, he also served as a high school rebbe at Yeshiva University High School for Boys.  In 1969, he moved to Israel and worked as a Staff Editor for the Encyclopaedia Judaica.  He also wrote numerous entries, including the one for Rabbi Joseph Dov Soloveitchik and Rabbi Eliezer Silver.

Upon the conclusion of the Encyclopaedia Judaica project, Rabbi Rakeffet pursued his love of teaching.  He was a pioneer in Torah education for diaspora students in Israel.  He was a member of the initial 1969 faculty of Jerusalem Torah College (BMT) and taught there for twenty years.  He also taught at Machon Gold and Michlalah.  He was also a founding faculty member at Midreshet Moriah, an advanced Torah study program for women.

Rabbi Rakeffet has been a member of the Gruss Kollel faculty since its inception in 1976. He also recruited Dr. Nechama Leibowitz to teach there as well.

Rabbi Rakeffet served in the Israel Defense Forces until the maximum allowable age.  He served in Lebanon during the 1982 Lebanon War.

In 1980, he was recruited by Aryeh Kroll to join the Mossad's clandestine Nativ operation to teach Torah in the Soviet Union. Rabbi Rakeffet visited the Soviet Union in 1981, 1985, and 1989 together with his wife Malkah, and recruited 200 others to also visit.  His initial visit motivated him to help found the Shvut Ami organization.

After the Iron Curtain fell, Rabbi Rakeffet followed his daughter into focusing on a new cause, the International Coalition of Missing Israeli Soldiers. At first, he spoke at fund-raising events.  He soon became close with the Baumels and participated in evaluating the various leads they had.  Unfortunately, no tangible outcome was realized.  He then conceived the idea of using the standards for permitting agunot to marry for these cases.  If the evidence indicated that the soldiers were no longer alive, the families might realize a sense of closure and the Israeli government might more easily negotiate with the enemies who held the bodies.  Rabbi Rakeffet's idea was accepted by the Israel Defense Forces. In 2001, he formed a beit din which was given the necessary clearance to analyze all available evidence.  After 2.5 years, the beit din concluded the soldiers had died.  Rabbi Rakeffet's halakhic innovation of "Presumed Dead; Place of Burial Unknown" (מקל'ן), is currently used by the IDF to declare a missing soldier "Presumed Dead" in similar cases.

Rabbi Rakeffet felt strongly that a documentary should be made about Rabbi Joseph B. Soloveitchik.  After much effort, he found Ethan Isenberg to produce the film, and a donor to subsidize it.  The documentary "The Lonely Man of Faith: The Life and Legacy of Rabbi Joseph B. Soloveitchik" was first shown in November 2006.

Rabbi Rakeffet finished his 10-year effort of writing his personal scholarly memoir, "From Washington Avenue to Washington Street", with its publication in 2011. Published by the OU Press in conjunction with Gefen Publishing House. It was his seventh published volume.

 One critic hailed the memoirs: "Although serious to the core, his wonderful sense of humor shines in this inspiring life story of a true intellectual who continues to devote his talents to the Jewish people and the State of Israel."

In June 2016, Rakafot Aharon Vol 3 was published by Shvut Ami.  Rabbi Dr. Yaakov S. Weinstein of East Brunswick, NJ compiled and annotated it based on contemporary Halachic topics presented by Rabbi Rakeffet between 1998 – 2002 in his advanced shiurim given at YU's Gruss Kollel.  The topics include: The classic Agunah, Mamzerut and Artificial Insemination.

In July 2019, Rakafot Aharon Vol 4 was published, also by Shvut Ami.  The first section on Hilkhot Kiddushin was compiled by Rabbi Dr. Weinstein, based on Rabbi Rakeffet's shiurim.  The second section on the Russian Saga consists of material on Rabbi and Mrs. Rakffet's visits to the Soviet Union while working for the Mossad during the 1980s.  The third section includes a portion of Rakeffet's published scholarship since 1993.  The fourth section contains unique documents and pictures, including the identification of every student in a famous picture of Rabbi Joseph Soloveitchik's 1960 classroom.

Positions
 Spiritual leader of Lower Merion Synagogue in Bala Cynwyd, Pennsylvania (1961–1962)
 Spiritual leader of Congregation Beth Ephraim and Maplewood Jewish Center in New Jersey (1962–1969)
 High School Rebbe at Yeshiva University High School for Boys (1962–1969)
 Staff Editor for Encyclopaedia Judaica (1969–1971)
 Jerusalem Torah College (BMT) (1969–1989)
 Machon Gold (1971–1989)
 Michlalah (The Jerusalem College for Women) (1971–1986)
 Midreshet Moriah (1987–2002)
 Gruss Kollel (1976 – Present)

Works
Bernard Revel: Builder of American Jewish Orthodoxy (1971)
The Silver Era: Rabbi Eliezer Silver and His Generation (1982)
Rakafot Aharon (1997) – 2 volumes, collected published writing, Published by Shvut Ami
Rakafot Aharon Vol 3 (2016) - In Response to Life: The Classic Agunah, Mamzerut, and Artificial Insemination. Published by Shvut Ami.  
Rakafot Aharon Vol 4 (2019) - Hilkhot Kiddushin, The Russian Saga, Published Contemporary Torah History, Documents and Pictures.  Published by Shvut Ami.  
 From Washington Avenue to Washington Street (2011), Gefen Publishing House and OU Press.

Articles
Tradition: A Journal of Orthodox Jewish Thought: Rakeffet-Rothkoff entries
The Commentator: The Torah and Rabbinics of the Early YC Years
Jewish Action: Rabbi Meir Kahane: His Life and Thought

Lectures
Online archive of articles and talks at YUTorah.org
Hesped for Joe DiMaggio #1
Hesped for Joe DiMaggio #2

Notes

Yeshiva University faculty
Jewish historians
Israeli historians of religion
Living people
1937 births
Rabbi Isaac Elchanan Theological Seminary semikhah recipients
Educators from New York City
American emigrants to Israel
Israeli soldiers
American Orthodox rabbis
Israeli Orthodox rabbis
21st-century American Jews